The Agency is a CBS television show that followed the inner workings of the United States Central Intelligence Agency. The series was created by Michael Frost Beckner and was executive produced by Michael Frost Beckner, Shaun Cassidy Productions and Radiant Productions in association with Universal Network Television and CBS Productions. It aired from September 27, 2001, until May 17, 2003, lasting two seasons. It featured unprecedented filming from the actual CIA headquarters.

Series overview

Episodes

Season 1 (2001–02)

Season 2 (2002–03)

Home video releases

References 

General references 
 
 
 

Lists of American drama television series episodes
Lists of American espionage television series episodes